In mathematics, the Mestre bound is a bound on the analytic rank of an elliptic curve in terms of its conductor, introduced by .

See also

Brumer bound

References

Elliptic curves
Theorems in number theory